Freetown Rosenwald School is a historic Rosenwald school building in the historic African American community of Freetown at Glen Burnie, Anne Arundel County, Maryland.  It is a simple, one-story, gable-roofed, rectangular frame building.  The exterior walls are sheathed in aluminum siding and the gable roof is covered with asphalt shingles and displays minimal overhang.  It was built in 1924–25, by the school construction program of the Julius Rosenwald Fund, to serve the local African American community. It is one of ten Rosenwald Schools surviving in Anne Arundel County.

It was listed on the National Register of Historic Places in 2007.

References

External links
, at Maryland Historical Trust
Freetown Community Association website

School buildings on the National Register of Historic Places in Maryland
Schools in Anne Arundel County, Maryland
Historically black schools
Rosenwald schools in Maryland
Glen Burnie, Maryland
National Register of Historic Places in Anne Arundel County, Maryland